Silverpuffs is a common name for several plants and may refer to:

 Uropappus lindleyi
 Microseris species

See also
Silverpuff, Chaptalia texana